Air Commodore John Nicholas Haworth Whitworth,  (10 January 1912 – 13 November 1974) was a Royal Air Force pilot in the 1930s and a commander during and after the Second World War. He was educated at Oundle School in Northamptonshire.

Whitworth was station commander of RAF Scampton during the planning of Operation Chastise; in 1955 he was a technical advisor for the film dramatisation of the raid, The Dam Busters.  Whitworth was portrayed by Derek Farr in the film.

Whitworth was later the Chief of Staff of the Ghana Air Force; he was succeeded by the Ghanaian J. E. S. de Graft-Hayford in 1962.

He retired to the village of Rodmarton in Gloucestershire with his wife.

References

External links
Air of Authority – A History of RAF Organisation – Air Cdre Whitworth

Royal Air Force officers
1912 births
1974 deaths
People from Buenos Aires
Companions of the Order of the Bath
Companions of the Distinguished Service Order
Recipients of the Distinguished Flying Cross (United Kingdom)
Ghana Air Force personnel
People educated at Oundle School